The European (EU) Union Asset Recovery Offices (ARO) are national central contact points that facilitate EU-wide tracing of assets derived from crime.

Council Decision 2007/845/JHA  (“The Decision”) obliges Member States to set up or designate such offices. It requests AROs to exchange information under the conditions laid down in Framework Decision 2006/960/JHA  (“the Swedish Initiative”) and in compliance with the applicable data protection provisions.

The Decision is also intended to support the CARIN (Camden Assets Recovery Interagency Network), a global network aimed at enhancing mutual knowledge about methods and techniques for cross-border identification, freezing, seizure and confiscation of illicitly acquired assets.

Member States are required to ensure that AROs cooperate with each other and help facilitating the tracing and identification of proceeds of crime and other crime related assets by exchanging information and best practices, both upon request and spontaneously. The exchange of information and best practices between AROs should take place regardless of their status (administrative, law enforcement or judicial authority). The purpose of AROs is to remove the financial gain from crime.

List of Member AROs 
  Austria - Bundesministerium für Inneres - Bundeskriminalamt
  Belgium - Central Office for Seizure and Confiscation (COSC)
  Bulgaria - Commission for Anti-Corruption and Illegal Assets Forfeiture (CACIAF)
  Croatia - Criminal police directorate - National police for suppression of corruption and organised crime - Economic crime and corruption department
  Cyprus - MOKAS (Unit for Combating Money Laundering)
  Czechia - National Organized Crime Agency (NCOZ)
  Denmark - State Prosecutor for Serious Economic & International Crime - The Danish Asset Recovery Office
  Estonia - Asset Recovery Bureau - National Criminal Police -Police and Border Guard Board
  Finland - National Bureau of Investigation/ Criminal Investigation/Financial Crime Intelligence
  France
 Central Directorate for Criminal Investigations - Platform for the identification of Criminal Assets (PIAC)
 AGRASC (Agence de gestion et de recouvrement des avoirs saisis et confisqués) Agency for the recovery and management of seized and confiscated assets)
  Germany
  Greece
  Hungary
  Ireland - Criminal Assets Bureau
  Italy
  Latvia
  Lithuania
  Luxembourg
  Malta - Asset Recovery Bureau.
  Netherlands 
  Poland
  Portugal
  Romania
  Slovakia
  Slovenia
  Spain
  Sweden
  United Kingdom

See also 
 Egmont Group of Financial Intelligence Units
 Financial intelligence
 Money laundering

References

Agencies of the European Union
Money laundering
Organizations established in 2007